Gontar is a Russian occupational surname that refers to a person who makes or installs wood shingles. It derives from Russian gont (гонт, shingle), from Polish gont (shingle), from Middle High German gant, beam, from Latin cantherius, rafter, from Greek kanthelion (κανθήλιον), rafter. The English word gantry is of similar derivation. The village of Gonty, Poland is evidence of the surname's Polish origin.
 
The same slavic word for shingle, and the surname, also exist in Ukrainian as both gont and hont, Gontar and Hontar, and in Polish, gont, Gontar. Ukrainian Гонтар may be approximated by Hontar, as Г in that language indicates an H that is slightly fricative. In Russian, Г sounds as a hard G, written in Ukrainian by a Ghe with upturn, Ґ. Many people in Ukraine, however, appear to use the Gontar pronunciation. The usual Russian Cyrillic spelling is  Гонтарь.

As spelled Gontar, 75% of people bearing the surname live in Russia, at 3,192. Yet 99% of people bearing the Hontar spelling live in Ukraine, and more than double the bearers of the Gontar spelling worldwide.

Notable people with the surname include:

 Abram Yutkovich Gontar (1908–1981), Soviet Jewish poet and novelist of Ukrainian origin, participant in the Kengir uprising
 Anastasiia Gontar, Russian Paralympic swimmer
 Anna Hontar, Ukrainian Paralympic swimmer
 Nikolai Gontar (born 1949), Russian footballer
 Olga Gontar (born 1979), Belarusian rhythmic gymnast

See also
 
 Gonchar

References

East Slavic-language surnames